Imaginum is a Mexican animated sci-fi-comedy film, produced by Ánima Estudios and released in theaters on August 19, 2005.

It features the voices of Eugenio Derbez and Ilse. The film took a total of 18 months to develop, in contrast to other animated films, which take up to 40 months to develop.

The film was later released direct-to-video in the United States on 9 December 2008 in both the English and Spanish languages.

The film grossed a total of $7.8 million pesos.

Plot
Yxxxxx is an intergalactic parasite with grandiose delusions, and is highly dangerous to other beings. However, he is currently confined in a mental space. He decides to force three other inmates, who are not exactly an example of prudence, to escape the mental asylum with him. He wants to involve them in his evil plans.

Cast
Eugenio Derbez as Yxxxxx
Ilse as Elisa Naranja
Giovanni Florido as Dante Naranja
Luis Fernando Orozco as Rocco Naranja

See also
Ánima Estudios

References

External links
Official website

2005 films
2005 animated films
2000s science fiction comedy films
Films about extraterrestrial life
Films set in psychiatric hospitals
Films directed by Alberto Mar
Mexican animated films
2000s Spanish-language films
Ánima Estudios films
2005 comedy films
Mexican science fiction comedy films
2000s Mexican films